Horsfieldia iriana is a species of plant in the family Myristicaceae. It is endemic to West Papua (Indonesia).

References

iriana
Flora of Western New Guinea
Taxonomy articles created by Polbot